Events in the year 1866 in Norway.

Incumbents
Monarch: Charles IV

Events

 5 March – The official inauguration of the Parliament of Norway Building.

Arts and literature
Erika Nissen, pianist, makes her concert debut in Berlin

Births

January to June
5 January – Johan Gjøstein, educator, newspaper editor and politician (died 1935)
21 January – Olaus Alvestad, educator and newspaper editor (died 1903)
15 March – Johan Vaaler, inventor (died 1910)
25 April – Aasulv Olsen Bryggesaa, politician and Minister (died 1922)
29 April – Kristian Prestgard, editor of Decorah-Posten (died 1946)
10 May – Thorolf Holmboe, painter (died 1935)
24 June – Peter Karl Holmesland, jurist and politician (died 1933)

July to December
29 July – Jens Zetlitz Monrad Kielland, architect (died 1926)
12 August – Johan Opsahl, politician
2 September – August Herman Halvorsen, politician (died 1929)
13 September – Ole Østmo, rifle shooter and Olympic medallist (died 1923)
28 October – Peter Collett Solberg, businessperson and politician (died 1934)
1 November – Betzy Kjelsberg, politician and feminist (died 1950)
29 November – Johan Friele, sailor and Olympic gold medallist (died 1927)
2 December – Ingvald Anker Andersen, politician

Full date unknown
Simon Christian Hammer, writer and journalist (died 1932)
Sigbjørn Obstfelder, writer (died 1900)

Deaths
20 March – Rikard Nordraak, composer (born 1842)
24 November – Peder Christian Hersleb Kjerschow, bishop (born 1786)

Full date unknown
Nicolai Benjamin Cappelen, jurist and politician (born 1795)
Louise Brun, actor (born 1831)
Conradine Birgitte Dunker, socialite and writer (born 1780)
Ole Paulssøn Haagenstad, politician (born 1775)
Jørgen Fredrik Spørck, military officer and politician (born 1787)

See also

References